Hum Ek Hain may refer to:

 Hum Ek Hain (1946 film), Indian film
 Hum Ek Hain (2004 film), Pakistani film